Swisslog Holding AG is a globally active Swiss company specializing in integrated automation solutions for warehouses, distribution centers and hospitals. It is headquartered in Buchs/Aarau, Switzerland. Swisslog has 2,500 employees in approximately 20 countries and had revenues of 620.8 million euros in 2015. The company is part of the KUKA Group, a Chinese robotics and automation solutions supplier. Until July 2015, Swisslog was listed on the SIX Swiss Exchange.

Area of operations 
Swisslog is organized into two divisions:
Warehouse & Distribution Solutions
Healthcare Solution

Warehouse & Distribution Solutions supplies industry-specific solutions for automated warehouses and distribution centers. Its core industries are retail and e-commerce, food and beverages, and pharmaceuticals.

Healthcare Solutions specializes in logistics automation solutions and is focused primarily on hospital logistics. Products and services for automated goods transport include pneumatic tube systems, automated guided vehicle systems, electric track vehicle systems as well as pharmaceutical logistics systems.

History 
Swisslog traces its roots back to Sprecher + Schuh AG, founded in Aarau in 1900 and split into two separate entities in 1985. After a successful public tender offer by KUKA, Swisslog merged with a KUKA subsidiary at the end of July 2015 and was delisted from the Swiss stock exchange. Swisslog is now part of the KUKA Group.

References 

Logistics companies of Switzerland
Construction and civil engineering companies of Switzerland
International information technology consulting firms
Aargau
1900 establishments in Switzerland
Swiss brands